The dollar (currency code LRD) has been the currency of Liberia since 1943. It was also the country's currency between 1847 and 1907. It is normally abbreviated with the sign $, or alternatively L$ or LD$ to distinguish it from other dollar-denominated currencies. It is divided into 100 cents.

First use

The first Liberian dollar was issued in 1847. It was pegged to the US dollar at par and circulated alongside the US dollar until 1907, when Liberia adopted the British West African pound, which was pegged to sterling.

Coins
In 1847 and 1862, copper 1 and 2 cents coins were issued and were the only Liberian coins until 1896, when a full coinage consisting of 1, 2, 10, 25 and 50 cents coins were introduced. The last issues were made in 1906.

Money notes
The Treasury Department issued notes between 1857 and 1880 in denominations of 10 and 50 cents, 1, 2, 3, 5 and 10 dollars.

Reintroduction
United States currency replaced the British West African pound in Liberia in 1935. Starting in 1937, Liberia issued its own coins which circulated alongside US currency.

The flight of suitcase-loads of USD paper by Americo-Liberians following the April 12, 1980 coup d'état created a currency shortage. This was remedied by minting of the Liberian  coins. The 7-sided coins were the same size and weight as the one-dollar coin; this prevented corrupt members of elite society leaving the country with Liberia's money.

In the late 1980s the coins were largely replaced with a newly designed  note modeled on the US greenback ("J. J. Roberts" notes). The design was modified during the 1990-2004 civil war to ostracize notes looted from the Central Bank of Liberia. This effectively created two currency zones—the new "Liberty" notes were legal tender in government-held areas (primarily Monrovia), while the old notes were legal tender in non-government areas. Each was not considered legal in the other territory. Following Charles Taylor's arrival in Monrovia in 1995, the J.J. Robert's bank notes were legally accepted in most parts of Monrovia for purchases. Banking and some majors institutions did not accept the J.J. Robert's bank note as legal tender during this period.

Following the election of the Charles Taylor government in 1997 a new series of banknotes dated 1999 was introduced on March 29, 2000.

Coins

These were augmented in 1960 with coins for 1, 5, 10, 25 and 50 cents. A  coin was issued the following year. Five-dollar coins were issued in 1982 and 1985 (see above). According to the 2009 Standard Catalog of World Coins (Krause Publications, Iola, WI), numerous commemorative coins (featuring U.S. Presidents, dinosaurs, Chinese Lunar-Zodiac animals, etc.) in denominations ranging from 1 to 2500 Dollars have been issued beginning in the 1970s through the present.

Banknotes
Five-dollar notes were introduced in 1989 which bore the portrait of J. J. Roberts. These were known as "J. J." notes. In 1991, similar notes were issued (see above) which replaced the portrait with Liberia's arms. These were known as "Liberty" notes.

On 29 March 2000, the Central Bank of Liberia introduced a new "unified" currency, which was exchanged at par for "J. J." notes and at a ratio of 1:2 for "Liberty" notes. The new banknotes each feature a portrait of a former president. These notes remain in current use, although they underwent a minor redesign in 2003, with new dates, signatures, and the CENTRAL BANK OF LIBERIA banner on the back.

On 27 July 2016, the Central Bank of Liberia announced new banknotes will be introduced with enhanced security features. All of the denominations are the same as previous issues, with the L$500 banknote being introduced as part of this series. On 6 October 2016, the Central Bank of Liberia introduced new banknotes, as announced.

On 17 November 2021, the Central Bank of Liberia announced a new series of banknotes, omitting the L$5 and L$10 banknotes which have been replaced by coins, along with an entirely new denomination, the L$1000.

See also
 Central Bank of Liberia
 Economy of Liberia

Exchange rate

References

External links

 Liberian banknotes
 Liberian banknotes on BanknoteNews

Economy of Liberia
1847 introductions
Currencies introduced in 1943